Kevin Siembieda (born April 2, 1956) is an American artist, writer, designer and publisher of role-playing games.

Career
Siembieda is a third-generation Polish American. He attended the College for Creative Studies in Detroit from 1974 to 1977. He wanted to be a comic book artist, but found the industry difficult to break into and published a small-press comic (A+ Plus, 1977-1978) with his company, Megaton Publications. In 1979 Siembieda discovered the Dungeons & Dragons Basic Rulebook and joined a role-playing group, the Wayne Street Weregamers, which met at Wayne State University in Detroit (where he befriended Erick Wujcik, who ran the group). Siembieda ran a game for the group, the Palladium of Desires, a combination of AD&D and his house rules. By 1980 the Wayne Weregamers became the Detroit Gaming Centre, with Siembieda its assistant director and Wujcik its director. Siembieda tried to interest gaming companies in his RPG with little interest; only Judges Guild made him an offer, but he accepted a job offer from them instead. He was an artist for Judges Guild for four months before working as a freelance artist for other publishers and trying to sell his RPG to them.

Siembieda is the co-founder and president of Palladium Books. He founded the company in April 1981 to publish his fantasy role-playing game, but had insufficient funds to publish any books; the mother of Bill Loebs loaned Siembieda $1,500 to publish his first RPG book, The Mechanoid Invasion (1981). By 1983 the company was successful enough for Siembieda to rent warehouse space and release his fantasy RPG, the Palladium Fantasy Role-Playing Game with a loan of $10,000 from his friend Thom Bartold who had also loaned him funds to print the other two books in the Mechanoid Trilogy, Journey and Homeworld in 1982. These were not just loans, but investments, and Siembieda established a system of paying royalties not just to the writers and artists, but also to those who lent him the capital needed to print the books: his investors. The following year, he extended his Palladium system to the superhero genre with Heroes Unlimited. A freelancer contacted Siembieda about producing a licensed role-playing game based on the Teenage Mutant Ninja Turtles comic book. Siembieda obtained the rights, but was dissatisfied with the freelancer's product. Erick Wujcik redesigned the game in five weeks, and it was published in 1985 as Teenage Mutant Ninja Turtles & Other Strangeness. Siembieda next obtained the license to publish a game based on the Robotech anime series, designing the Robotech role-playing game  published in 1986.

Siembieda wrote the RPG Rifts (1990) as a trade paperback in a two-column format which he laid out by hand. He supported Wujcik in founding his own company, Phage Press. In 1992, Siembieda sued Wizards of the Coast over its first RPG book, The Primal Order; GAMA president Mike Pondsmith helped the parties reach a compromise in March 1993. Siembieda also disagreed with White Wolf magazine and GDW over their magazines' coverage of Palladium games. He demanded that websites devoted to Rifts and Palladium be taken down, claiming that they violated his intellectual property, but softened his stance in 2004. Siembieda fired Bill Coffin due to editorial differences and discontent with the Rifts Coalition Wars, which Siembieda and Coffin co-authored. On April 19, 2006 he announced that Palladium Books was on the verge of bankruptcy, which he blamed on a former employee who was convicted of embezzlement. Siembieda filed a lawsuit on May 7, 2010 against Trion Worlds for its MMORPG Rift: Planes of Telara, and a settlement was reached in October 2010. Role-playing games Siembieda has created include Palladium Fantasy Role-Playing Game (1983), Heroes Unlimited (1984), Robotech (1986), and Rifts (1990). He is also an artist, known for occasionally illustrating Palladium Books products. Siembieda contributed art and cartography to several early Judges Guild products for the Dungeons & Dragons, RuneQuest and Traveller lines.

Siembieda's Robotech RPG Tactics Kickstarter is one of the largest failures in tabletop Kickstarter history. The project failed to deliver on its goals and raised over $1.4M. Despite not making its goal and unable to deliver Wave 2, Palladium did not refund money given to the project.

Early illustration credits

Judges Guild

Dungeons & Dragons 

 - Front cover, interior art; maps (with B. Faust)
 - Front cover; interior art (with Gerald Busby and Ed L. Perry)
 - Front cover (with Ken Simpson and Rick Houser)
 - Interior art.
 - Interior art (with Aaron Arocho, Michael D. Reagan and Jennell Jaquays)
 - Interior art (with A. Arocho, Bob Bingham and P. Jaquays)
 - Front cover; interior art (with P. Jaquays)
 - Interior art (with P. Jaquays)
 - Interior art (with P. Jaquays)
 - Interior art
 - Interior art (with P. Jaquays)
 - Front cover (with Bill Hadley); interior art (with P. Jaquays).
 - Interior art (with Brian Wagner, David Allen, Robert Bledsaw, Jr., and Carol Lind).
 - Interior art (with P. Jaquays)
 - Interior art (with P. Jaquays)
 - Interior art (with Pixie Bledsaw, E. L. Perry, and K. Simpson)
 - Interior art (with P. Jaquays)
 - Interior art (with P. Jaquays)
 - Interior art (with K. Simpson, Erin McKee, A. Arocho and E. L. Perry)
 - Front cover; interior art (with E. McKee, E. L. Perry and K. Simpson)
 - Interior art (with E. McKee, R. Houser, K. Simpson, Paul W. Vinton and the Sorceror's Guild)

RuneQuest 

 - Interior art (with P. Jaquays and A. Arocho)
 - Front cover; interior art (with A. Arocho and B. Faust)
 - Front cover

Traveller 

 - Front cover; interior art (with P. Jaquays)
 - Interior art (with A. Arocho and Peter Jenkins)
 - Interior art (with P. Jenkins)

Universal Fantasy 

 - Interior art (with K. Simpson and E. L. Perry)
 - Front cover; interior art (with R. Houser, P. Jaquays and J. Mortimer)
 - Interior art (with K. Simpson, J. Mortimer and P. W. Vinton)
 - Back cover

Judges Guild Journal 

 [JG 103]
 [JG 110] - Front cover, interior art.
 [JG 121] - Interior art
 [JG 160] - Front cover, interior art
 [JG 200] - Interior art

Dungeoneer Journal 

 [JG 390] - Interior art.
 [JG 450] - Front cover, interior art
 [JG 470] - Front cover, interior art

Pegasus 

 [JG 610] - Interior art
 [JG 620] - Interior art
 [JG 870] - Interior art
 [JG 1190] - Interior art
 [JG 1210] - Interior art

FASA 
 - Interior art (with William H. Keith, Jr.)

TSR 
 (interior art)

Palladium role-playing games 
The Mechanoid Invasion (April 1981)
Palladium Fantasy Role-Playing Game (July 1983)
Heroes Unlimited (August 1984)
Robotech (November 1986)
Beyond the Supernatural (October 1987), with Randy McCall
Robotech II: The Sentinels (September 1988)
Rifts (August 1990)
Macross II (July 1993)
Rifts Chaos Earth (June 2003)
Dead Reign (November 2008), with Josh Hilden and Joshua Sanford

References

External links 
Palladium Books Online
List of works at RPGnet Game Index

1956 births
Living people
American fantasy writers
American illustrators
American publishers (people)
American science fiction writers
Fantasy artists
Megaverse (Palladium Books)
Writers from Detroit
Role-playing game artists
Role-playing game designers
Science fiction artists
American male novelists
Novelists from Michigan
American people of Polish descent